Opsaridium is a genus of cyprinid fish found in Africa.  Currently, 12 species are in this genus.

Species 
 Opsaridium boweni (Fowler, 1930)
 Opsaridium engrauloides (Nichols, 1923)
 Opsaridium leleupi (Matthes, 1965)
 Opsaridium loveridgii (Norman, 1922)
 Opsaridium maculicauda (Pellegrin, 1926)
 Opsaridium microcephalum (Günther, 1864)
 Opsaridium microlepis (Günther, 1864) (lake salmon)
 Opsaridium peringueyi (Gilchrist & W. W. Thompson, 1913) (southern barred minnow)
 Opsaridium splendens Taverne & De Vos, 1997
 Opsaridium tweddleorum P. H. Skelton, 1996 (dwarf sanjika)
 Opsaridium ubangiense (Pellegrin, 1901)
 Opsaridium zambezense (W. K. H. Peters, 1852) (barred minnow)

References 
 

 

Taxa named by Wilhelm Peters
Taxonomy articles created by Polbot